Architectuul is an online architecture catalog that uses crowdsourcing to build content. It was founded in 2010 by a team of architects, graphic designers and software engineers. All of the text and many of the images uploaded to the site use a Creative Commons license, making the process similar to Wikipedia. Architectuul has buildings from various era's with a large range from the 20th Century and rare Constructivist architecture.

Architectuul is utilised as a source by several publications and Universities, including The Wall Street Journal.

References

External links 
 Architectuul

Online databases
Architecture databases